Bull Gap (el. ) is a mountain pass on Bull Mountain, part of the Great Craggy Mountains.  Though the Blue Ridge Parkway doesn't go through the gap, it is the most immediate to it and is accessible by hiking.

References

Landforms of Buncombe County, North Carolina
Mountain passes of North Carolina
Transportation in Buncombe County, North Carolina
Blue Ridge Parkway